10th arrondissement may refer to:
10th arrondissement of Paris
10th arrondissement of Marseille
10th arrondissement of the Littoral Department, Benin

Arrondissement name disambiguation pages